The 2013 Swedish Open was a tennis tournament played on outdoor clay courts as part of the ATP World Tour 250 Series of the 2013 ATP World Tour and as part of the International Series on the 2013 WTA Tour. It took place in Båstad, Sweden, from July 6 through July 14, 2013 for the Men's tournament and from July 13 through July 21, 2013 for the Women's tournament. It was also known as the 2013 SkiStar Swedish Open for the Men's and the 2013 Collector Swedish Open for the Women's for sponsorship reasons. It was the 66th edition for the Men's and the 5th edition for the Women's.

ATP singles main draw entrants

Seeds 

 1 Rankings are as of June 24, 2013

Other entrants 
The following players received wildcards into the singles main draw:
  Markus Eriksson 
  Andreas Vinciguerra 
  Elias Ymer

The following players received entry from the qualifying draw:
  Henri Laaksonen
  Julian Reister
  Diego Sebastián Schwartzman
  Antonio Veić

The following players received entry as lucky loser:
  Marius Copil

Withdrawals 
Before the tournament
  Simone Bolelli
  Rogério Dutra da Silva
  David Ferrer (ankle injury)
  Jerzy Janowicz
  Paolo Lorenzi (ankle injury)
  Guido Pella

ATP doubles main draw entrants

Seeds 

 Rankings are as of June 24, 2013

Other entrants 
The following pairs received wildcards into the doubles main draw:
  Isak Arvidsson /  Micke Kontinen
  Grigor Dimitrov /  Mikael Tillström
The following pair received entry as alternates:
  Thiemo de Bakker /  Rameez Junaid

Withdrawals 
Before the tournament
  Paolo Lorenzi (ankle injury)

WTA singles main draw entrants

Seeds 

 1 Rankings are as of July 8, 2013

Other entrants 
The following players received wildcards into the singles main draw:
  Belinda Bencic
  Ellen Allgurin
  Rebecca Peterson

The following players received entry from the qualifying draw:
  Andrea Gámiz
  Anastasia Grymalska 
  Richèl Hogenkamp
  Lesley Kerkhove

Withdrawals
Before the tournament
  Alexa Glatch
  Kaia Kanepi
  Magdaléna Rybáriková
  Yaroslava Shvedova
  Venus Williams

Retirements
  Simona Halep (back injury)

WTA doubles main draw entrants

Seeds 

 1 Rankings are as of July 8, 2013

Other entrants 
The following pairs received wildcards into the doubles main draw:
  Ellen Allgurin /  Rebecca Peterson
  Jacqueline Cabaj Awad /  Cornelia Lister

Champions

Men's singles 

  Carlos Berlocq def.  Fernando Verdasco, 7–5, 6–1

Women's singles 

  Serena Williams def.  Johanna Larsson, 6–4, 6–1

Men's doubles 

  Nicholas Monroe /  Simon Stadler def.  Carlos Berlocq /  Albert Ramos, 6–2, 3–6, [10–3]

Women's doubles 

  Anabel Medina Garrigues /  Klára Zakopalová def.  Alexandra Dulgheru /  Flavia Pennetta, 6–1, 6–4

References

External links 
 

Swedish Open
Swedish Open
Swedish Open
Swedish Open
Swedish Open